The Quilcene Historical Museum, Quilcene, Washington, was established in 1991 and operates under non-profit status.

The museum has published books about the history of Quilcene, Washington, and Brinnon, Washington.

The Quilcene Historical Museum's major events during the year include Opening Day Weekend, school tours and special tours throughout the school year, Brinnon Shrimp Fest, Quilcene High School Alumni Reunions, Quilcene Fair and Parade, and Quilcene Art Walks.

In 2007, the museum was remodeled, doubling its space from 860 sq ft.

References

External links
Quilcene Historical Museum

History museums in Washington (state)
Museums in Jefferson County, Washington